Dwayne W. Prescott is an American politician. He is a Republican politician representing District 17 in the Maine House of Representatives.

Political career 

In 2014, Prescott ran for election to represent District 17 in the Maine House of Representatives. He defeated write-in candidate David Woodsome in the Republican primary, and the winner of the Democratic primary withdrew from the race, leaving Prescott unopposed in the general election. In 2016, Prescott defeated Democratic challenger Gerry Gibson, and in 2018 the winner of the Democratic primary (this time David Buck) again withdrew before the general election. Prescott is running for re-election again in 2020.

As of October 2020, Prescott sits on the following committees:
 Health Coverage, Insurance and Financial Services (Ranking Member)
 Bills in the Second Reading
 Engrossed Bills

Electoral record 

Prescott was unopposed in the 2014 general election, because Democrat Elaine Plourde withdrew.

Prescott was unopposed in the 2016 Republican primary.

In 2018, Prescott was unopposed in the Republican primary, and also unopposed in the general election, because Democrat David Buck withdrew.

References 

Living people
Republican Party members of the Maine House of Representatives
21st-century American politicians
Year of birth missing (living people)